Patrick "Patchy" Mix (born August 16, 1993) is an American professional mixed martial artist, currently signed to Bellator MMA where he competes in the Bantamweight division. As of February 1, 2022, he is #2 in the Bellator Bantamweight Rankings.

Background
Mix was born in Angola, New York, a small village approximately 20 miles outside of Buffalo. Mix began wrestling in the eighth grade, joining the Lake Shore High School wrestling team. With only 2 years of wrestling experience under his belt, Mix became a state qualifier in his weight class in the tenth grade, and in the process became the first wrestler from Lake Shore High to make the state tournament in over 40 years. Mix graduated from Lake Shore Senior High School in 2011, and his senior quote was "Luck is when preparation meets opportunity. Six minutes on the mat is all that matters."

Mixed martial arts career

King of the Cage
Making his pro debut in May 2016, Mix began regularly fighting for the King of the Cage promotion. Mix went undefeated in the promotion, going 9–0 and he became KOTC Bantamweight champion after defeating future UFC bantamweight Andre Ewell by submission.

Bellator MMA
After having championship success in King of the Cage, Mix was signed by Bellator MMA. He made his promotional debut on June 14, 2019 at Bellator 222, facing highly touted prospect Ricky Bandejas. Mix was victorious rather quickly, showing a superior ground game and submitting Bandejas with a rear-naked choke just 66 seconds into the first round.

Mix was next scheduled to face Dominic Mazzotta on October 26, 2019 at Bellator 232. However, Mazzotta withdrew from the bout and was replaced by Isaiah Chapman. Mix once again showed dominance on the ground, submitting Chapman with a Suloev stretch kneebar in the first round.

For Mix's next bout, he fought in the Rizin Fighting Federation, representing Bellator in a card that featured RIZIN fighters against Bellator fighters. He took on Yuki Motoya at RIZIN 20 on December 31, 2019. He was victorious via first round submission. Subsequently, Mix signed his second multi-fight contract with Bellator.

After racking up three straight first round victories as part of the Bellator promotion, Mix was linked to a fight against Juan Archuleta for the vacant Bellator MMA Bantamweight World Championship at Bellator 242. However, Archuleta tested positive for COVID-19 and the bout was delayed. The bout was rebooked and took place at Bellator 246 on September 12, 2020. Mix lost the bout via unanimous decision, thus facing defeat for the first time in either his amateur or professional MMA career.

Mix was expected to face James Gallagher at Bellator 258 on May 7, 2021. However, Gallagher withdrew from the bout. UFC alum Albert Morales was announced as a replacement. Mix won the bout via arm-triangle choke in the third round.

The bout against James Gallagher was rescheduled for Bellator 270 on November 5, 2021. At the weigh-ins, Mix missed weight for his bout, weighing in at 137.8 pounds, 1.7 pounds over the bantamweight non-title fight limit. The bout proceeded at catchweight and Mix was fined a percentage of his purse which went to Gallagher. Mix won the fight via guillotine choke submission in the third round.

Bellator Bantamweight World Grand Prix 
In the first round bout of the $1 million Bellator Bantamweight World Grand Prix Tournament, Mix faced Kyoji Horiguchi on April 23, 2022 at Bellator 279. He won the bout via unanimous decision and moved on to the next round.

In the semi-finals, Mix faced Magomed Magomedov on December 9, 2022 at Bellator 289. He was victorious via second round technical submission and advanced to the final round of the tournament.

In the finals, Mix is scheduled to face Raufeon Stots for the Interim Bellator Bantamweight World Championship on April 22, 2023 at Bellator 295.

Personal life
Mix has a daughter, born in 2018, from a previous relationship. He is currently dating Tatiana Suarez. Mix has an older brother with intellectual disabilities who helps serve as inspiration for Mix.

Championships and accomplishments
Bellator MMA
Tied (with Eduardo Dantas and Jaylon Bates) for most stoppage wins in Bellator Bantamweight division history (four)
Tied (with Jaylon Bates) for most submission wins in Bellator Bantamweight division history (four)
King of the Cage
King of the Cage Bantamweight Championship (One time; former)
Two successful title defenses
MMAjunkie.com
2021 November Submission of the Month vs. James Gallagher

Mixed martial arts record

|-
|Win
|align=center|17–1
|Magomed Magomedov
|Technical Submission (guillotine choke)
|Bellator 289
|
|align=center|2
|align=center|2:39
|Uncasville, Connecticut, United States
|
|-
|Win
|align=center|16–1
| Kyoji Horiguchi
| Decision (unanimous)
| Bellator 279
| 
| align=center|5
| align=center|5:00
| Honolulu, Hawaii, United States
|
|-
|Win
|align=center|15–1
|James Gallagher
|Submission (guillotine choke)
|Bellator 270
|
|align=center|3
|align=center|0:39
|Dublin, Ireland
|
|-
|Win
|align=center|14–1
|Albert Morales
|Submission (arm-triangle choke)
|Bellator 258
|
|align=center|3
|align=center|2:40
|Uncasville, Connecticut, United States
|
|-
|Loss
|align=center|13–1
|Juan Archuleta
|Decision (unanimous)
|Bellator 246
|
|align=center|5
|align=center|5:00
|Uncasville, Connecticut, United States
|
|-
|Win
|align=center|13–0
|Yuki Motoya
|Submission (guillotine choke)
|RIZIN 20
|
|align=center|1
|align=center|1:37
|Saitama, Japan
|
|-
|Win
|align=center|12–0
|Isaiah Chapman 
|Submission (Suloev stretch)
|Bellator 232
|
|align=center|1
|align=center|3:49
|Uncasville, Connecticut, United States
|
|-
|Win
|align=center|11–0
|Ricky Bandejas
|Submission (rear-naked choke)
|Bellator 222
|
|align=center|1
|align=center|1:06
|New York City, New York, United States
|
|-
|Win
|align=center|10–0
|Turrell Galloway
|TKO (elbows and punches)
|King of the Cage: Combat Zone
|
|align=center|1
|align=center|1:45
|Niagara Falls, New York, United States
|
|-
|Win
|align=center|9–0
|Keith Richardson
|Submission (kneebar)
|King of the Cage: In the Mix
|
|align=center|3
|align=center|3:29
|Salamanca, New York, United States
|
|-
|Win
|align=center|8–0
|Fard Muhammad 
|Submission (rear-naked choke)
|King of the Cage: Territorial Conflict 
|
|align=center|3
|align=center|3:48
|Niagara Falls, New York, United States
|
|-
|Win
|align=center|7–0
|Tony Gravely
|Submission (guillotine choke)
|King of the Cage: No Retreat
|
|align=center|1
|align=center|1:44
|Salamanca, New York, United States
|
|-
|Win
|align=center|6–0
|Andre Ewell
|Submission (rear-naked choke)
|King of the Cage: Ultimate Mix 
|
|align=center|1
|align=center|2:28
|Las Vegas, Nevada, United States
|
|-
|Win
|align=center|5–0
|Jesse Bazzi
|Decision (unanimous)
|King of the Cage: Counterstrike 
|
|align=center|3
|align=center|5:00
|Niagara Falls, New York, United States
|
|-
|Win
|align=center|4–0
|Nicholas Gonzalez 
|Decision (unanimous)
|King of the Cage: Public Offense 
|
|align=center|3
|align=center|5:00
|Salamanca, New York, United States
|
|-
|Win
|align=center|3–0
|Alberto Martinez Jr.
|Submission (rear-naked choke)
|King of the Cage: Raw Deal
|
|align=center|1
|align=center|0:51
|Niagara Falls, New York, United States
|
|-
|Win
|align=center|2–0
|Noel Arcibal 
|Submission (rear-naked choke)
|King of the Cage: National Dispute
|
|align=center|1
|align=center|2:55
|Niagara Falls, New York, United States
|
|-
|Win
|align=center|1–0
|Tobias Taylor 
|Decision (unanimous)
|Prodigy MMA
|
|align=center|3
|align=center|5:00
|Erie, Pennsylvania, United States
|
|-

See also
 List of current Bellator fighters
 List of male mixed martial artists

References

1993 births
Living people
American male mixed martial artists
Bantamweight mixed martial artists
Mixed martial artists utilizing wrestling
Mixed martial artists utilizing Brazilian jiu-jitsu
People from Angola, New York
Bellator male fighters
American male sport wrestlers
Amateur wrestlers
American practitioners of Brazilian jiu-jitsu